Private Hospital (Norwegion: Privatsykehuset) Haugesund is a private hospital located in Haugesund  in Rogaland, Norway.  Privatsykehuset Haugesund is part of  Scanhealth Scandinavia.

Privatsykehuset Haugesund operates in partnership with Haugesund Røntgen Institutt (a private radiology centre) and Klinikk Hausken (a private infertility centre) all of which are situated in the center of Haugesund. Privatsykehuset Haugesund was established in 1997. It is co-located with  Haugesund Medical Center (Haugesund Medisinske senter). The hospital has branches in orthopedics, eye surgery, urology, skin diseases, general surgery and plastic surgery. The hospital is licensed for 20 beds and operates both outpatient and inpatients.

Notes

External links
Privatsykehuset Haugesund website
Scanhealth Scandinavia  website

Hospital buildings completed in 1997
Hospitals in Norway
Hospitals established in 1997
1997 establishments in Norway